The Fitzroy Islands comprise a group of four rocky islets that lie within the upper reaches of Payne Bay in Port Davey, an oceanic inlet, located in the south west region of Tasmania, Australia.

Features and location
Part of the Breaksea Islands Group, the Fitzroy Islands are part of the Port Davey Islands Important Bird Area, so identified by BirdLife International because of its importance for breeding seabirds. Recorded breeding seabird species are the silver gull, sooty oystercatcher and Caspian tern.

See also

 List of islands of Tasmania

References

Islands of Tasmania
South West Tasmania
Protected areas of Tasmania